Amsacta duberneti is a moth of the family Erebidae. It was described by Hervé de Toulgoët in 1968. It is found on Madagascar.

References

Moths described in 1968
Spilosomina
Moths of Madagascar
Moths of Africa